Help Ever Hurt Never is the first studio album by Japanese singer-songwriter Fujii Kaze. It was released on May 20, 2020, through Universal Sigma. A cover album of English songs, called Help Ever Hurt Cover, was released as a bonus disc with the first pressing of the CD. It was later made available digitally. It was certified Gold in sales by RIAJ.

Tour
A supporting tour for the album, Help Ever Hall Tour, started on December 25, 2020 and ran until January 31, 2021. It was Fujii's first national tour. Tickets for this tour were in the form of advance applications using the serial code included with the album, and lottery applications for general sales were accepted from November 9. In addition, for performances held after January 2021, official ticket trading was carried out at Chikepla Trade. From the perspective of preventing the spread of new coronavirus infections, the performances were held at 50% of the capacity of each venue and with a checkered seating arrangement.

Track listing

Standard edition 
Titles as given on Western streaming services first, followed by the original Japanese title and then the English titles as given in the booklet.
"Nan-Nan" ("WTF lol") – 5:20
"Mo-Eh-Wa" ("I'm Over It") – 5:01
"Yasashisa" ("Kindness") – 4:00
"Kiri ga Naikara" ("Cause It's Endless") – 3:37
"Tsumi no Kaori" ("Flavor of Sin") – 3:34
"Cho Si Noccha Te" ("Oops I Pushed My Luck") – 4:42
"Tokuninai" ("Not Particularly") – 3:25
"Shinunoga E-Wa" ("I'd Rather Die") – 3:05
"Kazeyo" ("Hey Mr. Wind") – 4:44
"Sayonara Baby" ("Sayonara Baby") – 4:20
"Kaerou" ("Go Home") – 4:44

Help Ever Hurt Cover 
Released as the second disc of the first pressing CD, as well as digitally.

"Close to You" (Carpenters) – 3:40
"Shape of You" (Ed Sheeran) – 2:25
"Back Stabbers" (O'Jays) – 3:08
"Alfie" (Burt Bacharach) – 2:32
"Be Alright" (Ariana Grande) – 3:04
"Beat It" (Michael Jackson)
"Don't Let Me Be Misunderstood" (The Animals) – 2:38
"My Eyes Adored You" (Frankie Valli) – 3:39
"Shake It Off" (Taylor Swift) – 4:22
"Stronger Than Me" (Amy Winehouse) – 3:46
"Time After Time" (Dinah Washington) – 4:06

Personnel 
 Fujii Kaze – vocals, piano
 Leon Yuuki – drums (tracks 1, 2, 5, 6, 7, 10 and 11)
 Osami Kobayashi – electric bass (tracks 1, 5, 10 and 11)
 Takumi Katsuya – double bass (track 7)
 Bunta Otsuki – electric guitar (tracks 1, 2, 5 and 10), acoustic guitar (track 9)
 Takashi Fukuoka – percussion (tracks 5, 6, 9 and 11)
 Tatsuhiko Yoshizawa – trumpet (track 5)
 Natsuki Oba – flute (track 5)
 Oda Sena – baritone saxophone (track 5)
 Yuta Ishii – tenor saxophone (track 5)
 Amane Takai – trombone (track 5)
 Rina Kodera – first violin (tracks 3, 6 and 11)
 Sayuri Yano – second violin (track 3)
 Natsue Kameda – second violin (tracks 6 and 11)
 Takahiro Enokido – viola (track 3)
 Mikiyo Kikuchi – first viola (tracks 6 and 11)
 Reiichi Tateizumi – second viola (tracks 6 and 11)
 Yuki Mizuno – cello (tracks 3, 6 and 11)

Charts

Weekly charts

Monthly charts

Year-end charts

References 

2020 albums
Japanese-language albums
Fujii Kaze albums
Universal Sigma albums